The University of Pennsylvania Campus Historic District is a historic district on the campus of the University of Pennsylvania, in Philadelphia, Pennsylvania, USA. The university relocated from Center City to West Philadelphia in the 1870s, and its oldest buildings date from that period. The Historic District was added to the National Register of Historic Places on December 28, 1978.

One of them, the Lea Laboratory of Hygiene ("Smith Labs"), was demolished in 1995.

Three contributing properties within the Historic District — College Hall, Furness Library, and Richards Medical Research Laboratories — are separately listed on the NRHP. St. Anthony Hall House is adjacent to the Historic District, and was listed on the NRHP in 2005.

Contributing properties
NOTES:
The properties below are listed alphabetically by the name used in the 1978 NRHP Nomination. Separately-listed properties are shaded in blue.
The online version of the 1978 NRHP Nomination is missing a page, leaving Buildings #6 and #7 unidentified.

Adjacent to the Historic District

References

National Register of Historic Places in Philadelphia
Gothic Revival architecture in Pennsylvania
Late Gothic Revival architecture
Tudor Revival architecture in Pennsylvania
University of Pennsylvania campus
Historic districts in Philadelphia
University and college buildings on the National Register of Historic Places in Pennsylvania
University City, Philadelphia
Historic districts on the National Register of Historic Places in Pennsylvania